Ammobaenetes is a genus of sand-treader crickets in the family Rhaphidophoridae. There are at least three described species in Ammobaenetes.

Species
These three species belong to the genus Ammobaenetes:
 Ammobaenetes arenicolus Strohecker, 1947 (white sand-treader cricket)
 Ammobaenetes lariversi Strohecker, 1944 (Nevada sand-treader cricket)
 Ammobaenetes phrixocnemoides (Caudell, 1907) (mesilla sand-treader cricket)

References

Further reading

 

Rhaphidophoridae
Articles created by Qbugbot